Doug Atchison is an American motion picture director and screenwriter. He received the Academy of Motion Picture Arts and Sciences Nicholl Fellowship for the screenplay for Akeelah and the Bee, which Atchison directed as a film in 2006.

After winning the Nicholl Fellowship, former ICM superagent Lou Pitt guided Atchison's screenplay into production in partnership with Lions Gate Entertainment and 2929 Entertainment. Akeelah and the Bee went on to become a critical and modest commercial success for which Atchison won the 2007 Image Award for Outstanding Writing in a Feature Film/TV Movie. In 2006, Atchison entered into a three-picture deal with The Weinstein Company.

It was reported in 2012 that Atchison is attached to direct a movie about the hockey player Derek Sanderson.

Atchison wrote the screenplay for the 2018 feature film Brian Banks for which he won the Humanitas Prize in the Independent Feature Film Category   and for which Atchison was nominated for the 2020 Image Award for Outstanding Writing in a Motion Picture (Film).

Atchison graduated from the University of Southern California's School of Cinema-Television.

Filmography
Ellen's Father (short) (1990) - director, writer
The Pornographer (1999) - director, writer
Akeelah and the Bee (2006) - director, writer
Spinning into Butter (2007) - writer
Brian Banks (2018) - writer

References

External links
 

American male screenwriters
American film directors
USC School of Cinematic Arts alumni
Living people
1966 births